Buvce, in Serbian Cyrillic Бувце, is a village in Serbia situated in the municipality of Lebane, district of Jablanica. In 2002, it had 109 inhabitants, of which 108 Serbs (99,08%).

Notes and references

See also

Linked articles 
 List of cities, towns and villages in Serbia
 List of settlements in Serbia (alphabetic)

External links
  Satellite view of Buvce
  Buvce

Populated places in Jablanica District